(born 15 October 1974) is an athlete from Tokyo, Japan, who is an accomplished women's wheelchair marathoner, ice sledge racer and triathlete. She was the first professional wheelchair athlete from Japan and the first Japanese athlete to win gold medals in both the Summer and Winter Paralympics. She has paraplegia.

Career
She has won the women's wheelchair division of the Boston Marathon five times, in 2007, 2008, 2009, 2010 and 2011; the Honolulu Marathon twice, in 2003 and 2005, the Oita Marathon four times, in 1999, 2001, 2002 and 2003 and the 2010 London Marathon with a time of 1:52:33. She competed at the 2012 Boston Marathon and in a close finish she was one second behind the winner Shirley Reilly.

At the 2000 Summer Paralympics she took a bronze medal in the marathon, while at the 2004 Games she won a gold medal in the 5000 metres and a silver in the marathon. Her personal best is 1:38:32, which she accomplished at the 2001 Oita Marathon.

She competed in ice sledge racing at the Winter Paralympics in 1994 and 1998, winning two golds and two silvers the latter year. She has also won medals in sledge racing's IPC World Championships.

Tsuchida was one of the final torchbearers during the opening ceremonies of the 2020 Summer Olympics.

References

External links 
 

1974 births
Living people
Japanese female wheelchair racers
Paralympic athletes of Japan
Athletes (track and field) at the 2000 Summer Paralympics
Athletes (track and field) at the 2004 Summer Paralympics
Paralympic ice sledge speed racers of Japan
Ice sledge speed racers at the 1994 Winter Paralympics
Ice sledge speed racers at the 1998 Winter Paralympics
Paralympic gold medalists for Japan
Paralympic silver medalists for Japan
Paralympic bronze medalists for Japan
Wheelchair racers at the 2000 Summer Olympics
Paralympic wheelchair racers
People with paraplegia
Medalists at the 1998 Winter Paralympics
Medalists at the 2000 Summer Paralympics
Medalists at the 2004 Summer Paralympics
Paralympic medalists in athletics (track and field)
20th-century Japanese women
21st-century Japanese women